Sharife Omar Cooper (born June 11, 2001) is an American professional basketball player for the Cleveland Charge of the NBA G League. He played college basketball for the Auburn Tigers.

High school career
In his freshman season in 2016–17, Cooper averaged 16 points and 4.4 assists per game, leading McEachern High School in Powder Springs, Georgia to a 29–1 record and an appearance in the Georgia High School Association (GHSA) Class 7A state semifinals. The following year, he led the Indians to a state quarterfinals appearance while posting a 26–3 record. He received considerable media attention in December 2017 for his 42-point performance against Jahvon Quinerly and nationally ranked Hudson Catholic Regional High School in the quarterfinals of the City of Palms Classic. He scored the game-winning buzzer-beater in an 83–81 overtime victory.

As a junior in 2018–19, Cooper led McEachern to a perfect 32–0 record and the first state title in school history while averaging 27.2 points, 8.1 assists, 5.6 rebounds and 4.3 steals per game. In the title-game win over Meadowcreek, he scored 20 points and dished four assists as McEachern finished ranked No. 1 in three national polls. He picked up most valuable player (MVP) honors at several tournaments, including the City of Palms Classic and Tournament of Champions. After the season, he was named USA Today All-USA Player of the Year, MaxPreps National Player of the Year, Mr. Georgia Basketball, and Georgia's Gatorade Player of the Year. He also earned USA Today All-USA first team and Naismith All-American second team honors. Cooper was selected to play in the 2020 McDonald's All-American Boys Game on January 23, 2020. On May 6, 2021, Cooper's #2 high school jersey number was retired at McEachern where he was honored as the most decorated male basketball player in school history.

Recruiting
On September 27, 2019, Cooper committed to play college basketball for Auburn. He became the highest-ranked recruit and the second five-star recruit in program history.

College career
Cooper missed the first 12 games of his freshman season due to a National Collegiate Athletic Association investigation into his eligibility. During that time, he explored professional options. On January 9, 2021, he made his Auburn debut, recording 26 points, nine assists and four rebounds in a 94–90 loss to Alabama. Four days later, Cooper posted a season-high 28 points, 12 assists and five rebounds in a 95–77 win over Georgia. As a freshman, he averaged 20.2 points, 8.1 assists and 4.3 rebounds per game through 12 appearances, earning Southeastern Conference All-Freshman Team honors. On April 2, 2021, Cooper declared for the 2021 NBA draft, forgoing his remaining college eligibility.

Professional career

Atlanta Hawks (2021–2022)
Cooper was selected in the second round of the 2021 NBA draft with the 48th pick by the Atlanta Hawks. On August 5, 2021, he signed a two-way contract with the Hawks, splitting time with their NBA G League affiliate, the College Park Skyhawks. He played for the Hawks in the 2021 NBA Summer League, recording 11 points on 5–11 shooting, and 6 assists in 28 minutes at his debut in a 85–83 loss against the Boston Celtics. Cooper made his NBA debut in the Hawks' season opener against the Dallas Mavericks, going 0-for-3 in field goals in a 113–87 win.

Cooper joined the Hawks' 2022 NBA Summer League roster. On July 22, 2022, Cooper re-signed with the Hawks on another two-way deal. He was waived three days later.

Cleveland Charge (2022–present)
On September 20, 2022, Cooper signed with the Cleveland Cavaliers. He was waived on October 15.

On October 24, 2022, Cooper joined the Cleveland Charge's training camp roster. Cooper was named to the G League's inaugural Next Up Game for the 2022–23 season.

Career statistics

NBA

|-
| style="text-align:left;"| 
| style="text-align:left;"| Atlanta
| 13 || 0 || 3.0 || .214 || .167 ||  || .4 || .4 || .0 || .0 || .5
|- class="sortbottom"
| style="text-align:center;" colspan="2"| Career
| 13 || 0 || 3.0 || .214 || .167 ||  || .4 || .4 || .0 || .0 || .5

College

|-
| style="text-align:left;"| 2020–21
| style="text-align:left;"| Auburn
| 12 || 12 || 33.1 || .391 || .228 || .825 || 4.3 || 8.1 || 1.0 || .3 || 20.2

Personal life
Cooper was born in Newark, New Jersey to Omar and Kindall Cooper, although the family moved to the Atlanta area when he was around the age of six. He has two sisters, Te'a and Mia, who both won state titles at McEachern, while Te'a continued on to play at Tennessee, South Carolina and Baylor before being drafted by the Phoenix Mercury in the 2020 WNBA draft. He also has a twin brother, Omar.

References

External links
Auburn Tigers bio
USA Basketball bio

2001 births
Living people
21st-century African-American sportspeople
African-American basketball players
American men's basketball players
American twins
Atlanta Hawks draft picks
Atlanta Hawks players
Auburn Tigers men's basketball players
Basketball players from Newark, New Jersey
College Park Skyhawks players
McDonald's High School All-Americans
Point guards
Twin sportspeople